DnaJ heat shock protein family (Hsp40) member A4 is a protein that in humans is encoded by the DNAJA4 gene.

References

Further reading